John Anthony Derrington  (24 December 1921  – 9 February 2008) was a British civil engineer.

Biography
Derrington was born in London. He held a Bachelor of Science degree in engineering and a Diploma of Imperial College.

He was head of the design group at Sir Robert McAlpine and also wrote in the Proceedings of the Institution of Civil Engineers (ICE) regarding multi-story concrete construction.

Affiliations and honours 
He was a fellow of the ICE, of the Institution of Structural Engineers (IStructE; 1984–85), and of the Royal Academy of Engineering. He was elected president of the IStructE for the 1979–80 session, of the ICE for the 1984–85 session and of the Offshore Engineering Society for 1987–88. In the 1986 Birthday Honours, he was invested as a Commander of the Order of the British Empire.

Death
Derrington lived in Rottingdean, East Sussex. He died on 9 February 2008 at the age of 86. The ICE held a memorial service for him at Westminster Cathedral on 10 November 2008.

References

Bibliography

        
        
        
        
        
        

1921 births
2008 deaths
British civil engineers
British Roman Catholics 
Engineers from London
Presidents of the Institution of Civil Engineers
Presidents of the Institution of Structural Engineers
Commanders of the Order of the British Empire
Fellows of the Royal Academy of Engineering